Sam Williams (born 9 June 1987) is an English footballer.

Career
Naturally a defensive midfielder before the start of the 2005–06 season, Williams took straight into the role of an attacker, after injuries to strikers. Although never having started a first team game for Aston Villa, Williams was a regular scorer for the clubs reserves.

Williams was sent on loan multiple times to gain first team experience, his first loan spell being at Wrexham where he scored on his debut against Wycombe Wanderers.

In November 2008, Williams spent a month on loan at League One side Colchester United, again scoring on his debut in a 1–0 victory over AFC Bournemouth.

In January 2009 he joined Walsall on another single month loan deal. He returned to Villa on 26 February due to a hip injury, although Saddlers boss Chris Hutchings refused to rule out Williams returning to the Bescot Stadium again.

Williams then joined Brentford on an initial one-month loan with a view to extend the deal. He came on as a substitute on his début against Barnet and missed a sitter, however 4 days later he came on again as a substitute and scored the goal in front on 10,672 fans which saw Brentford snatch a point in the 3–3 draw with Wycombe Wanderers. The loan was extended until the 2008–09 season on 25 March.

He joined Yeovil Town on 21 July 2009 on a two-year deal after impressing whilst on trial at the club. His first goal for the club was on 12 September in a 2 – 2 draw with Stockport.

He was informed by the club at the end of the season that he would not be awarded a new deal.
 Williams joined Charlton Athletic on trial in July 2011 and scored in his uncompetitive debut against Welling United on 9 July 2011.
In August 2011 Williams signed for Dagenham & Redbridge. On 7 May 2013, he was released by the Daggers due to the expiry of his contract.

Career statistics

References

External links

Sam Williams' profile at the Yeovil site

1987 births
Living people
Footballers from Greenwich
English footballers
Association football forwards
Aston Villa F.C. players
Wrexham A.F.C. players
Brighton & Hove Albion F.C. players
Colchester United F.C. players
Walsall F.C. players
Brentford F.C. players
Yeovil Town F.C. players
Dagenham & Redbridge F.C. players
English Football League players